Chandralekha is a 1995 Indian Tamil-language romantic action film, directed by Nambirajan. Starring Vijay and Vanitha Vijayakumar in her debut, the film had music composed by Ilaiyaraaja.  The film revolves around an orthodox Brahmin girl falls in love with a Muslim boy, Rahim, but their families don't accept it. Meanwhile, the lovers try to elope and are caught by militants in the forest.

The film was released on 23 October 1995 on Diwali clashing with Rajinikanth film Muthu, and Chandralekha performed mediocre at the box office, even though the film songs were a hit. The film is about Hindu-Muslim marriage riots. The film's title was also titled after the hit song Chandralekha from Thiruda Thiruda (1993) film.

Plot
Chandralekha, an orthodox Brahmin girl, falls in love with, Rahim, a Muslim boy. Whereas, Salima loves Rahim since her childhood. Mustafa, Rahim's brother, and Jamal, Salima's brother, agrees to engage Salima and Rahim without Rahim's permission. Their families discover the love between Rahim and Chandralekha and don't accept it. Meanwhile, the lovers try to run away from everybody but are caught by militants in the forest. Salima becomes mentally unstable unable to bear her love failure. Rahim and Chandralekha are rescued from the militants by the police and brought safely to the village. Mustafa transforms and agrees for their wedding. Jamal, upset that her sister has gone mad, kills Chandralekha and Rahim at the railway station. Immediately, policemen kill Jamal. In the end, Chandralekha makes a wish that she and Rahim's dead body are to be buried together.

Cast

Soundtrack
The music was composed by Ilaiyaraaja.

Reception
Thulasi of Kalki wrote that the director seems to have thought he's dealing with a huge thing. The story is about love beyond religion. In this one thing, the man has felt too happy but left all the other things together with the fort, the wall and the trench.

References

External links

1995 films
Films scored by Ilaiyaraaja
1990s Tamil-language films
Indian interfaith romance films
1995 romantic drama films
Indian romantic drama films